The Arizona Complex League Rockies are a professional baseball team competing as a Rookie-level affiliate of the Colorado Rockies in the Arizona Complex League of Minor League Baseball. The team plays its home games at Salt River Fields at Talking Stick near Scottsdale, Arizona. The team is composed mainly of players who are in their first year of professional baseball either as draftees or non-drafted free agents from the United States, Canada, Dominican Republic, Venezuela, and other countries.

History
In 1992, the Colorado Rockies and Chicago Cubs fielded a cooperative team in the Arizona League (AZL), known as the Arizona League Rockies/Cubs. The team was then an affiliate of only the Rockies from 1993 to 2000, and named as such.  The teams were located in Mesa (1992–1993), Chandler (1994–1997), and Tucson (1998–2000). The team won its first, and to date only, championship in 1998, under manager P. J. Carey.

Prior to the 2021 season, the Arizona League was renamed as the Arizona Complex League (ACL). Also in 2021, the Rockies rookie team returned to Arizona for the first time in 20 years.

Roster

References

External links
 Baseball Reference

Baseball teams established in 1992
Arizona Complex League teams
Professional baseball teams in Arizona
Colorado Rockies minor league affiliates
Chicago Cubs minor league affiliates
1992 establishments in Arizona